İkinci Yüzbaşılı (also, İkinci Yuzbaşlı, Yuzbashly, and Yuzbashyly Vtoryye) is a village in the Agdam Rayon of Azerbaijan.  The village forms part of the municipality of Xındırıstan.

References 

Populated places in Aghdam District